Andrzej Mikołaj Dera (born 10 September 1961) is a Polish politician. He was elected to the Sejm on 25 September 2005, getting 7520 votes in 36 Kalisz district as a candidate from Law and Justice list.

See also
Members of Polish Sejm 2005-2007

External links
Andrzej Mikołaj Dera - parliamentary page - includes declarations of interest, voting record, and transcripts of speeches.

1961 births
Living people
People from Ostrów Wielkopolski
Law and Justice politicians
Members of the Polish Sejm 2005–2007